The shooting competitions at the 2017 Southeast Asian Games were held at National Shooting Range Centre in Subang, Selangor.

The 2017 Games feature competitions in 14 events, 9 for men and 5 for women.

Medal table

Medalists

Men

Women

References

External links
  

2017 in shooting sports
2017 Southeast Asian Games events
Shooting at the Southeast Asian Games